Lyja is a fictional character appearing in American comic books published by Marvel Comics. A Skrull, she possesses the ability to shapeshift into almost any humanoid or animal form. Modifications on her body give her the power to generate energy blasts.

Publication history
Lyja the Laserfist first appeared in Fantastic Four #357 (Oct. 1991), and was created by Tom DeFalco and Paul Ryan. She was revealed to have been impersonating Alicia Masters ever since Fantastic Four #265 (April 1984). Lyja remained a supporting character in the series until the launch of the "Heroes Reborn" storyline in 1996. She returned in a tie-in to the Secret Invasion limited series in 2008.

Fictional character biography
The Skrull Empire—longtime enemies of the Fantastic Four—embarked on a plan to infiltrate the team by impersonating Alicia Masters—blind sculptor and love interest of Benjamin Grimm (the Thing). The author of the plan, Paibok the Power Skrull, selected the warrior Lyja to be the spy and espionage agent—possibly as retribution because they had once had a failed affair. Nevertheless, Lyja trained extensively to pull off the disguise, even using contact lenses to make herself blind in human form to learn how to navigate the world as Alicia did.

Soon after Lyja's arrival on Earth, a near-omnipotent being known as the Beyonder kidnapped numerous super-powered beings (including three members of the Fantastic Four), transporting them to a makeshift Battleworld, where they participated in a series of "Secret Wars" between the so-called forces of good and evil. Lyja took the opportunity of their distraction to replace Alicia, greeting the Fantastic Four on their return to Earth from Battleworld. The Skrull plan almost hit a snag when Lyja discovered that the Thing opted to remain on Battleworld at the end of the war, instead of returning home to Earth. Lyja instead seduced Johnny Storm, the Human Torch. When the Thing learned that Johnny and "Alicia" were lovers, they became estranged. Lyja fell in love with Johnny and eventually they were married under the false pretense of her as Alicia Masters.

Eventually Alicia's stepfather, the villain known as the Puppet Master, realized that the woman claiming to be his stepdaughter was an imposter, and took his suspicions to the Thing. Lyja was forced by the Thing to transform back to her true Skrull appearance. She disclosed her true identity, as well as the fact that the real Alicia was a captive of the Skrulls. She aided the Fantastic Four in finding the real Alicia Masters in the Skrull Empire, but was believed to be slain when she threw herself in the path of a blast which Paibok had meant for the Human Torch.

In actuality, Paibok recovered Lyja and revealed to Devos the Devastator that she was still alive. Paibok, with the assistance of Devos, awoke Lyja from her comatose state, and bestowed her with the power to fly and fire energy blasts from her hands becoming "Lyja the Lazerfist". These powers were later revealed to come from a special device implanted into her. Joining them in search of vengeance, the three arrived on Earth, and isolated and battled the Torch at Empire State University. Panicking, the Torch burst into his Nova Flame and destroyed the campus. Alongside Devos and Paibok, Lyja witnessed a battle between the Fantastic Four and an alternate Fantastic Four. Lyja still bore feelings for the Torch and once again betrayed her cohorts to side with the Four.

Lyja then first encountered Aron the Watcher, and aided the Fantastic Four against Doctor Doom. Alongside the Fantastic Four, Lyja battled Devos, Paibok, Klaw, and Huntara. Lyja impersonated Bridget O'Neil, and became jealous on discovering Johnny Storm's affection for Bridget.

After returning to the Fantastic Four and Johnny, Lyja claimed she was pregnant with Johnny's child. Over time, Lyja and Johnny began to grow close again. When Lyja delivered the "child" (an egg), the implant that gave her the "Lazerfist" powers was also removed, returning Lyja to an ordinary Skrull with no extra powers beyond her shapeshifting. The implant was subsequently absorbed by a normal human, apparently an electronics expert named Raphael Suarez, who gained the "Lazerfist" powers, and attempted to contact the Fantastic Four for their assistance but after the hectic events that followed the hatching of the "egg", Raphael wandered off, realizing the Fantastic Four were not going to be of any help in their current state, and has not been referenced since.

Although Lyja and Johnny were growing close, Lyja was continuously torn about telling Johnny something. She was too scared to risk shattering the bonds they had managed to form again, and kept putting it off. Ultimately, it was too late. The "egg" was revealed, not to be their child, but rather a Skrull bio-weapon, which Lyja subsequently destroyed after it hatched. Johnny, enraged at being betrayed and deceived again by Lyja, broke things off with her again.

Lyja was still in love with Johnny and stalked him while as a human, Laura Green. Johnny was initially interested in a fellow college student but when he realized nothing was going to materialize with her his focus shifted to Laura/Lyja. Lyja, having learned her lessons well, eventually decided to reveal herself before Johnny felt betrayed again. After sharing a kiss with Laura, Johnny already knew that his ex-wife was in fact Laura Green.
During the Onslaught crisis when Lyja was injured she attempted to tell Johnny the truth but he informed her that he already knew. The couple seemed to be on track to reconciling their relationship until the Fantastic Four were presumed dead after a devastating fight with Onslaught, and as a result, Lyja left to attempt a normal life, masquerading again as a human woman. Soon after the Fantastic Four's were revealed to have survived the fight with Onslaught, Johnny mentions that he can not locate Lyja.

Secret Invasion

During the Secret Invasion storyline, Lyja poses as the Invisible Woman in order to send the Baxter Building to the Negative Zone. She reveals herself to her former spouse and attacks him, feeling angry that he had forgotten her. During the course of their battle, Johnny saves Lyja from being hit by a police car, pulled in through the portal. The two reconcile after that, but a Negative Zone creature attacks them. They manage to defeat the creature, but Lyja passes out from her injuries. Some time later, when the "new" Fantastic Four fly off to the prison, Franklin and Valeria are grabbed by multiple Negative Zone creatures, however Lyja saves them. She informs Johnny that she had been working in a book store when a Skrull approached her, insisting she join them. They attempted to convince her to help them blow up the Baxter Building, but instead she sends the Fantastic Four to the Negative Zone, in hopes of keeping them from harm's way. When Ben, Johnny, Franklin, Val and the Tinkerer were ready to leave the Negative Zone, she refused to leave, as she wanted to stay behind and find out who she really was.

Future Foundation
Lyja later appeared as an ally of the Future Foundation, helping them in locating the scattered atomic remnants of the Molecule Man. Having assumed the identity of Yondu Udonta to escape persecution for being a Skrull, she helped Foundation member Julie Power infiltrate a galactic prison where one of these remnants (which was attached to Rikki Barnes) was located. She later killed Kl'Rath, a Zn'rx ally of The Maker, for him having killed innocent Skrull children, impersonated him and helped in thwarting The Maker's plans. Upon Alex Power's invitation, she subsequently joined the Future Foundation.

Powers and abilities
Lyja's Deviant Skrull heritage gives her the ability to change size, shape, and color at will, thus taking on any appearance, but not the characteristics of other beings or objects.
 
For a brief time, because of genetic alteration (later revealed to be an implant) by Paibok the Power Skrull, Lyja can project laser-like beams from her hands without harm to herself known as "bio-blasts". She could suspend herself in the air by firing them beneath her feet. These powers were lost when her body rejected the energy-generating implant during "birth".

Lyja wears body armor of unspecified materials. She wore special contact lenses that rendered her blind while impersonating Alicia Masters.

Lyja had been trained in combat by the Skrull military, as well as acting. She was educated in Earth culture, history, and language by Skrull tutors. Lyja is a talented creator of abstract sculptures to avoid making representative ones.

In the Secret Invasion storyline, she regained her energy capabilities through unknown means, including invisible force fields. She has tremendous resistance to intense heat and flames of the Human Torch.

Other versions

Marvel Zombies
Lyja appears in the Marvel Zombies Universe on a planet besieged by the Zombie Galactus - consisting of zombie versions of Giant-Man, Spider-Man, Iron Man, Luke Cage, Wolverine and Hulk during a Black Panther crossover. Here she possesses the power of the Invisible Woman as part of an experiment following the death of the Super-Skrull in this universe; unable to replicate the Super-Skrull, the Fantastic Four's powers were instead given to four different Skrulls. She is loyal to the Skrulls and seems insulted when the Johnny Storm of the regular Marvel Universe - who has been transported into this universe with the 'new' Fantastic Four of the Torch, the Thing, the Black Panther and Storm - admits to knowing her.

She is shortly thereafter infected with the zombie virus, along with the rest of her team. During the subsequent conflict between the zombie-Skrull-Fantastic Four and the new Fantastic Four, she is decapitated by a vibranium dagger thrown by the Black Panther, and her head is subsequently destroyed by Black Panther before she can bite Johnny after she lands near his ankle.

MC2
In the MC2 universe, Lyja is once again married to the Human Torch and is a member of the Fantastic Five, under the name Ms. Fantastic. The couple has a son, Torus Storm, who inherited both Lyja's shape-shifting abilities and the Torch's flame powers. She remains active among the Fantastic Five and is sporadically seen in the Spider-Girl series and related mini-series. Spider-Girl mentions in their first encounter that if she was not fighting Lyja she would probably ask for her autograph, as she was a fan.

Power Pack
Lyja is introduced within the Skrulls vs. Power Pack miniseries as a young Skrull who is impersonating Katie Power, as well as being a commander under the orders of Warpriest Kh'oja in which he framed the Power siblings by stealing special treasures from Patchworld.

In other media

Television
 Lyja appeared in the 1994 Fantastic Four TV series voiced by Katherine Moffat. She is shown as a commander to the Skrull army.

References

External links
 Lyja at Marvel.com

Characters created by Tom DeFalco
Comics characters introduced in 1991
Fantastic Four characters
Fictional characters with energy-manipulation abilities
Fictional characters with slowed ageing
Fictional actors
Fictional artists
Fictional impostors
Fictional sculptors
Marvel Comics characters who are shapeshifters
Marvel Comics extraterrestrial superheroes
Marvel Comics female superheroes
Skrull